This is a list of butterflies of Mauritania. About 30 species are known from Mauritania, none of which are endemic.

Papilionidae

Papilioninae

Papilionini
Papilio demodocus Esper, [1798]

Pieridae

Pierinae
Colotis amata calais (Cramer, 1775)
Colotis antevippe (Boisduval, 1836)
Colotis aurora evarne (Klug, 1829)
Colotis chrysonome (Klug, 1829)
Colotis danae eupompe (Klug, 1829)
Colotis liagore (Klug, 1829)
Colotis phisadia (Godart, 1819)
Colotis vesta amelia (Lucas, 1852)
Colotis eris (Klug, 1829)
Pinacopterix eriphia tritogenia (Klug, 1829)
Euchloe falloui (Allard, 1867)

Pierini
Pontia daplidice (Linnaeus, 1758)
Pontia glauconome Klug, 1829
Belenois aurota (Fabricius, 1793)
Belenois gidica (Godart, 1819)

Lycaenidae

Theclinae

Theclini
Hypolycaena philippus (Fabricius, 1793)

Polyommatinae

Lycaenesthini
Anthene kikuyu (Bethune-Baker, 1910)

Polyommatini
Cupidopsis jobates mauritanica Riley, 1932
Tarucus balkanicus (Freyer, 1843)
Tarucus rosacea (Austaut, 1885)
Zizeeria knysna (Trimen, 1862)
Euchrysops malathana (Boisduval, 1833)

Nymphalidae

Danainae

Danaini
Danaus chrysippus alcippus (Cramer, 1777)

Limenitinae

Adoliadini
Hamanumida daedalus (Fabricius, 1775)

Hesperiidae

Coeliadinae
Coeliades forestan (Stoll, [1782])

Pyrginae

Celaenorrhinini
Sarangesa laelius (Mabille, 1877)

Carcharodini
Spialia doris daphne Evans, 1949
Spialia spio (Linnaeus, 1764)

Hesperiinae

Baorini
Borbo borbonica (Boisduval, 1833)

See also
List of moths of Mauritania
Wildlife of Mauritania

References

Seitz, A. Die Gross-Schmetterlinge der Erde 13: Die Afrikanischen Tagfalter. Plates
Seitz, A. Die Gross-Schmetterlinge der Erde 13: Die Afrikanischen Tagfalter. Text 

Maur

Mauritania
Mauritania
Butterflies
Butterflies